This is a list of wine-related list articles on Wikipedia.

Wines by country

 List of Appellation d'Origine Contrôlée wines (France)
 List of Italian DOC wines
 List of Italian DOCG wines
 List of Italian IGT wines
 List of VDQS wines (France)
 List of wine-producing countries

Wines by grape variety

Famous wines
 Dom Pérignon

See also
 Lists of beverages
 List of wine-producing regions
 List of wine personalities
 Outline of wine

Lists of drinks